USS LST-34 was a United States Navy  used exclusively in the Asiatic-Pacific Theater during World War II. Like many of her class, she was not named and is properly referred to by her hull designation.

Construction
LST-34 was laid down on 15 March 1943, at Pittsburgh, Pennsylvania, by the Dravo Corporation; launched on 15 June 1943; sponsored by Mrs. Verne C. Cobb; and commissioned on 26 July 1943.

Service history
During World War II, LST-34 was assigned to the Asiatic-Pacific theater and participated in the following operations: the Gilbert Islands operation in November and December 1943; the Marshall Islands operation during the occupation of Kwajalein and Majuro Atolls in January and February 1944, and the occupation of Eniwetok Atoll in February March 1944; the Marianas operation during the capture and occupation of Saipan in June 1944; the Leyte landingsin October and November 1944; the Lingayen Gulf landings in January 1945; and the assault and occupation of Okinawa Gunto in May 1945.

Postwar career
Following the war, LST-34 performed occupation duty in the Far East from March to November 1946. She returned to the United States and was decommissioned on 15 November 1946, and transferred to Military Government, Ryukyus. Her name was struck from the Navy list on 23 December 1947. She ran aground in the Far East in January 1949, and her hulk was abandoned.

Awards
LST-34 earned six battle stars for her World War II service.

References

Bibliography

External links

 

LST-1-class tank landing ships of the United States Navy
World War II amphibious warfare vessels of the United States
Ships built in Pittsburgh
1943 ships
Ships built by Dravo Corporation